Independence Day Award, Bangladesh's highest civilian honours - Winners, 2000-2009:

2000

Ten individuals were awarded.

2001

2002

Four individuals and one organization were awarded.

2003

Two individuals were awarded.

2004

Seven individuals and three organizations were awarded.

2005

One individual and one organization were awarded.

2006

Two organization were awarded.

2007

In the year 2007, two organizations were awarded:

2008

Three individuals and 1 organization were awarded.

2009

Four personalities received the award in 2009.

References

Civil awards and decorations of Bangladesh